When Love Took Wings is a 1915 short comedy film directed by and starring Fatty Arbuckle.

Cast
 Roscoe 'Fatty' Arbuckle as Reckless Fatty
 Minta Durfee as The Girl
 Frank Hayes as The Girl's Father
 Joe Bordeaux as Fatty's rival
 Al St. John as Hank Perkins, another rival
 Ted Edwards as Minister (uncredited)

See also
 Fatty Arbuckle filmography

References

External links

1915 films
Films directed by Roscoe Arbuckle
American silent short films
1915 comedy films
American black-and-white films
1915 short films
Silent American comedy films
Keystone Studios films
American comedy short films
1910s American films